The 2022–23 Southern Illinois Salukis men's basketball team represents Southern Illinois University Carbondale during the 2021–22 NCAA Division I men's basketball season. The Salukis are led by fourth-year head coach Bryan Mullins and play their home games at the Banterra Center in Carbondale, Illinois as members of the Missouri Valley Conference.

Previous season
The Salukis finished the 2021–22 season 16–15, 9–9 in MVC play to finish in sixth place. They lost in the quarterfinals of the MVC tournament to Drake.

Roster

Schedule and results

|-
!colspan=12 style=|Exhibition

|-
!colspan=12 style=| Regular season

|-
!colspan=12 style=| MVC Tournament

Source

References

2021–22
2022–23 Missouri Valley Conference men's basketball season
2022 in sports in Illinois
2023 in sports in Illinois